The 1920 Chicago American Giants baseball team represented the Chicago American Giants in the Negro National League (NNL) during the 1920 baseball season. The team compiled a 49–21–3 record and won the first NNL pennant. Rube Foster was the team's owner and manager. The team played its home games at Schorling Park in Chicago. 

The team's leading batters were:
 Center fielder Cristóbal Torriente - .411 batting average, .606 slugging percentage, 58 RBIs in 66 games (Torriente was later inducted into the Baseball Hall of Fame.)
 Catcher George Dixon - .324 batting average, .463 slugging percentage in 45 games
 Second baseman Bingo DeMoss - .314 batting average, .390 slugging percentage in 67 games

The team's leading pitchers were Dave Brown (13–3, 1.82 ERA, 101 strikeouts), Tom Williams (12–4, 1.83 ERA), and Tom Johnson (11–0, 1.84 ERA).

References

1920 in sports in Illinois
Negro league baseball seasons